Terry Bonchaka (c. 1982 – 29 October 2003) was a Ghanaian hiplife artist who after a performance died in a car accident.

Education 
He had his basic education at Ewit Greenwich Classical Academy and secondary education at Adisadel College.

Discography
List of songs over the period.

 Lomna Va
 Ghana Lady
Pulele
Ewurade
I am Aware
Asem Ben Ni
Chichinappi

Death 
He died in a car accident while returning from a performance at a Hall week celebration that was held at University of Ghana.

References 

Ghanaian musicians
1982 births
2003 deaths
Year of birth uncertain
Road incident deaths in Ghana